Cholesky may refer to:
 André-Louis Cholesky, French military officer and mathematician,
 Cholesky decomposition, developed by the mathematician,
 Incomplete Cholesky factorization,
 Symbolic Cholesky decomposition.